Jollain may refer to:

 Jollain (engravers), a family of French engravers
 Nicolas-René Jollain (1732–1804), a French painter

See also
 Jollain-Merlin, a district in Brunehaut, France
 Jolleyn, a village in Robat, Iran